The Court at 497-503½ North Madison Avenue is a bungalow court located at 497-503½ N. Madison Ave. in Pasadena, California.

Description and history 
The court consists of three buildings containing eight residential units; the buildings surround a narrow courtyard. The buildings were built in 1928 and designed by A. Ritter. The stucco homes in the court were designed in the Spanish Colonial Revival style and feature tile roofs, decorative grilles over the windows, and archways.

The court was added to the National Register of Historic Places on July 11, 1983.

References

External links

Bungalow courts
Bungalow architecture in California
Houses in Pasadena, California
Houses completed in 1928
Houses on the National Register of Historic Places in California
National Register of Historic Places in Pasadena, California
1928 establishments in California
Spanish Colonial Revival architecture in California